Kane Webber (born 6 July 1980) is an Australian professional golfer.

Webber was born in Lismore, New South Wales. He attended the University of Colorado in the United States and turned professional in 2004.

Webber played on the Asian Tour from 2006 to 2009, winning the Macau Open in May 2006. He played on the European Tour from 2007 to 2009 where his best finish was third at the 2008 Maybank Malaysian Open, an event co-sanctioned by the Asian Tour. He also played a handful of events on other tours (Challenge Tour, PGA Tour, Nationwide Tour, PGA Tour of Australasia, OneAsia Tour).

In September 2005, he married Dawn Webber of Denver, Colorado and they have a daughter that was adopted from Ethiopia in 2009 and a son, also adopted from Ethiopia in 2012.

Professional wins (4)

Asian Tour wins (1)

Other wins (3)
2006 Wyoming Open
2011 Wyoming Open
2016 Wyoming Open

References

External links

Australian male golfers
Colorado Buffaloes men's golfers
Asian Tour golfers
European Tour golfers
People from Lismore, New South Wales
Sportsmen from New South Wales
1980 births
Living people